Charles Lewis Taylor (?February 3, 1922) was an American industrialist born in Philadelphia, He graduated from Lehigh University in 1876.  Taylor College, a dormitory for upperclass students at Lehigh University, is named in honor of Charles Taylor.

Early career
Taylor first went to work as an assistant chemist for the Cambria Iron Company in Johnstown, Pennsylvania. From there he moved to Pittsburgh where he was the Superintendent of the Homestead Steel Works. It was when he became General Manager of The Hartman Steel Company that Taylor first began to work for Andrew Carnegie.

References

Year of birth missing
1922 deaths
Businesspeople from Philadelphia
Lehigh University alumni
19th-century American businesspeople